Portuguese in Asia may refer to:

 Portuguese colonization in Asia
 Portuguese presence in Asia
 Present Portuguese people who live in Asia
 Luso-Asians
 The Portuguese language in Asia